Kerstin Hartmann (born 14 June 1988 in Ulm) is a German rower. At the 2012 Summer Olympics, she competed in the Women's coxless pair with Marlene Sinnig. At the 2016 Summer Olympics in Rio de Janeiro, she competed in the women's coxless pair with teammate Kathrin Marchand. They finished in 8th place.

She won European silver in the women's pairs with Marlene Sinnig in 2010 and 2013 and with Kathrin Marchand in 2016.

References

1988 births
Living people
Olympic rowers of Germany
Rowers at the 2012 Summer Olympics
Rowers at the 2016 Summer Olympics
Sportspeople from Ulm
German female rowers
European Rowing Championships medalists
20th-century German women
21st-century German women